Worship The Witch is the first EP released by American melodeath/thrash band Skeletonwitch.

Track listing

Personnel
Chance Garnette – vocals
Nate Garnette – guitars
Scott Hedrick – guitars
Eric Harris – bass
Derrick Nau – drums

2006 debut EPs
Skeletonwitch albums
Albums with cover art by John Dyer Baizley
Thrash metal EPs